Thioredoxin domain-containing protein 3 (TXNDC3), also known as spermatid-specific thioredoxin-2 (Sptrx-2), is a protein that in humans is encoded by the NME8 gene (also known as the TXNDC3 gene) on chromosome 7.

Function 

This gene encodes a protein with an N-terminal thioredoxin domain and three C-terminal nucleoside diphosphate kinase (NDK) domains, but the NDK domains are thought to be catalytically inactive. The sea urchin ortholog of this gene encodes a component of sperm outer dynein arms, and the protein is implicated in ciliary function.

Clinical significance 

Mutations in the TXNDC3 gene are associated with primary ciliary dyskinesia.

References

Further reading

External links 
 GeneReviews/NCBI/NIH/UW entry on Primary Ciliary Dyskinesia